Niv may refer to:
 Niv, a personal name; for people with the name, see 
 Niv Art Movies, a film production company of India
 Niv Art Centre, in New Delhi, India

NIV may refer to:
 The New International Version, a translation of the Bible into English
 Non-invasive ventilation, a medical treatment

NiV may refer to:
 Nipah virus, a highly virulent human pathogen